Rodney Belgrave (30 March 1881 – 1 August 1926) was a cricketer. He played in two first-class matches for British Guiana and Trinidad in 1905/06 and 1908/09.

See also
 List of Guyanese representative cricketers

References

External links
 

1881 births
1926 deaths
Cricketers from British Guiana
Trinidad and Tobago cricketers